The geography of the European Union describes the geographic features of the European Union (EU), a multinational polity that occupies a large portion of Europe and covers 4,422,773 km2 (1,707,642 sq mi). Its European territory extends northeast to Finland, northwest to Ireland, southeast to Cyprus and southwest to the Spanish exclaves on the Mediterranean shores of North Africa. Additionally, the EU includes numerous islands around the world, and French Guiana in South America.

Collectively, it represents the seventh largest territory in the world by area. Including all overseas territories, the EU shares borders with 20 countries.

Geography by member states
The European Union has 27 member states.  See the geography of each current member state:

Physical geography

Most of the European Union is on the European continent. The only member state of the EU which is wholly outside of Europe is Cyprus, which is in Asia. The EU includes less than half of the territory of Europe. Significant parts of the continent especially in the east (e.g. European Russia, Ukraine, Belarus) and smaller parts in the north and centre are not part of the EU. The member states of the EU have land borders with 23 other nations.

With overseas territories included, the European Union is shored by the Indian and Pacific Oceans as well as by the Caribbean Sea. European mountain ranges include the Alps, Pyrenees, Carpathian Mountains, Balkan Mountains and Scandinavian Mountains, and the border mountain ranges of the Caucasus and the Urals; the highest mountain in the Union is Mont Blanc in the Alps. Lake Vänern in Sweden is the largest lake in the Union.

Several overseas territories and dependencies of various member states are also formally part of the EU (for Spain: the Canary Islands, Ceuta and Melilla; for Portugal: the Azores and Madeira; for France: Réunion, French Guiana, Martinique, Guadeloupe, Mayotte and Saint Martin) while in other cases territories associated with member states are not part of the EU (for Denmark: Greenland and the Faroe Islands; for the Netherlands: Aruba, Curaçao, Sint Maarten; for France: French Polynesia, Wallis and Futuna or New Caledonia).

Including overseas territories of member states, the EU includes most types of climate from Arctic to tropical. Meteorological averages for the EU as a whole are therefore not meaningful. The majority of the population live in areas with a Mediterranean climate (southern Europe), a temperate maritime climate (western Europe), or a warm summer continental or hemiboreal climate (in eastern member states).

Geology 

Europe's most significant feature is the dichotomy between highland and mountainous Southern Europe and a vast, partially underwater, northern plain ranging from the British Isles in the west to Poland in the east. These two halves are separated by the mountain chains of Pyrenees, Alps, Carpathian and Balkan Mountains. The northern plains are delimited in the west by the Scandinavian mountains. Major shallow water bodies submerging parts of the northern plains are the Celtic Sea, the North Sea, the Baltic Sea complex, and the Barents Sea.

The northern plain contains the old geological continent of Baltica, and so may be regarded as the "main continent", while peripheral highlands and mountainous regions in south and west constitute fragments from various other geological continents.

The geology of Europe is hugely varied and complex, and gives rise to the wide variety of landscapes found across the continent, like the rolling plains of Hungary.

Climate

The climate of the European Union is of a temperate, continental nature, with a maritime climate prevailing on the western coasts and a mediterranean climate in the south.  The climate is strongly conditioned by the Gulf Stream, which warms the western region to levels unattainable at similar latitudes on other continents.  Western Europe is oceanic, while eastern Europe is continental and dry.  Four seasons occur in western Europe, while southern Europe experiences a wet season and a dry season.  Southern Europe is hot and dry during the summer months.  The heaviest precipitation occurs downwind of water bodies due to the prevailing westerlies, with higher amounts also seen in the Alps.  Tornadoes occur within Europe, but tend to be weak. The Netherlands experiences a disproportionately high number of tornadic events.

Both these islands lie in the Atlantic. As for the land on the European continent, the mildest climate occurs in the northwest part of Iberian Peninsula (also Spain and Portugal), between Bilbao, A Coruña and Porto.

Rivers 

The most important rivers in the European Union are Danube, Rhine, Elbe, Oder, Vistula, Seine, and Rhône, among others.

European Union rivers by discharge 
 Danube - 6,450 m³/s
 Rhine - 2,315 m³/s
 Rhône - 1,900 m³/s (Waal - 1,500 m³/s as main distributary of Rhine)
 * Sava - 1,609 m³/s (tributary of the Danube)
 Po - 1,460 m³/s (largest river in Italy)
 Vistula - 1,080 m³/s
 Loire - 889 m³/s
 * Tisza - 863 m³/s (tributary of the Danube)
 Elbe - 860 m³/s
 * Inn - 735 m³/s (tributary of the Danube)

European Union rivers by length 
The following are the longest rivers in the EU alongside their approximate lengths:

 Danube -  (partially - 2628 km in the EU)
 Rhine -  (partially - nearly 1100 km in the EU, nearly 150 km entirely in Switzerland or on its border with Liechtenstein)
 Elbe - 
 Vistula - 
 Tagus   - 
 Loire - 
 Ebro - 
 Meuse - 
 Douro - 
 Oder - 
 Guadiana - 
 Rhône - 
 * Warta -  (major tributary of Oder)
 Seine  - 
 * Mureș -  (tributary of Tisza)
 * Prut - * (partially, border of the EU for nearly 742 km) (tributary of the Danube)
 * Sava - * (partially - 726 km) (tributary of the Danube)
 * Drava -  (tributary of the Danube)
 Po - 
 Guadalquivir - 
 * Olt -  (tributary of the Danube)
 * Tisza - * ( before 1880) (partially - 605 km in the EU) (tributary of the Danube)
 Garonne - 
 * Siret - * (partially - 559 km)
 Kemijoki -  (longest river in Finland)
 * Moselle  (major left tributary of Rhine)
 * Main  (major right tributary of Rhine)
 Torne -  (very small part near the source is in Norway)
 Dalälven -  (longest river entirely in Sweden)
 * Inn (river)  (tributary of the Danube)
 Marne -  (major tributary of the Seine)
 Maritsa -  (partially - 513 km in the EU: 309 km entirety in Bulgaria; the lower course forms the border of the EU for 204 km)
 Júcar - 
 Dordogne - 
 * Saône -  (major tributary of Rhône)
 Neman - * (partially - 475 km in the EU, 116 km of them as border of the EU)
 Ume - 
 ** Mur -  (tributary of Drava, Danube)
 Ångerman - 
 * Klarälven -  (major tributary of the Göta älv)
 Lule - * (a very small part near the source is in Norway)
 Gauja - 
 Weser - 
 Kalix - 
 * Vindel River -  (major tributary of the Ume River)
 Ljusnan - 
 Indalsälven - 
 * Vltava -  (major tributary of the Elbe)
 Ialomița - 
 Struma - 
 ** Someș -  (tributary of Tisza, Danube)
 Adige - 
 Skellefte - 
 Tiber - 
 * Vah -  (tributary of the Danube)
 Pite - 
 * Faxälven -  (major tributary of the Ångerman)
 Vardar - 
 Charente - 
 * Iskar -  (longest river entirely in Bulgaria) (tributary of the Danube)
 Shannon - 
 Daugava - * (partially - 357 km in the EU)
 Minho - 
 * Tundzha -  (partially - 328 km) (major tributary of Maritsa)
 Segura -

Human geography

Demographics

The most populous member state is Germany, with an estimated 82.1 million people, and the least populous member state is Malta with 0.5 million. Birth rates in the EU are low with the average woman having 1.6 children.  The highest crude birth rates is in the Republic of Ireland with 16.876 births per thousand people per year and in France with 13.013 births per thousand people per year. Germany has the lowest birth rate in Europe with 8.221 births per thousand people per year.

Largest cities

The European Union is home to more global cities than any other region in the world. Over 16 cities with populations over one million inhabitants, counted in its city proper. Densely populated regions that have no single core but have emerged from the connection of several cities and are now encompassing large metropolitan areas are Rhine-Ruhr having approximately 11.5 million inhabitants (Cologne, Düsseldorf, et al.), Randstad approx. 7 million (Amsterdam, Rotterdam, The Hague et al.), the Flemish Diamond approx. 5.5 million, Frankfurt/Rhine-Main approx. 4 million (Frankfurt, Wiesbaden et al.) and the Upper Silesian Industry Area approx. 3.5 million. (Katowice, Sosnowiec et al.).

Environment

In 1957, when the EU was founded, it had no environmental policy or laws.  Today, the EU has some of the most progressive environmental policies of any state in the world.  The environmental policy of the EU has therefore developed in remarkable fashion in the past four decades. An increasingly dense network of legislation has emerged, which now extends to all areas of environmental protection, including: air pollution control, water protection, waste management, nature conservation, and the control of chemicals, biotechnology and other industrial risks. The Institute for European Environmental Policy estimates the body of EU environmental law amounts to well over 500 Directives, Regulations and Decisions. Environmental policy has thus become a core area of European politics.

Such dynamic developments are surprising in light of the legal and institutional conditions which existed in the late 1950s and 60s. Acting without any legislative authority, European policy-makers initially increased the EU's capacity to act by defining environmental policy as a trade problem. The most important reason for the introduction of a common environmental policy was the fear that trade barriers and competitive distortions in the Common Market could emerge due to the different environmental standards. However, in the course of time, EU environmental policy emerged as a formal policy area, with its own procedures. The legal basis of EU environmental policy was not more explicitly established until the introduction of the Single European Act in 1987.

Initially, EU environmental policy was rather introspective. More recently, however, the Union has considered global environmental governance. The role of the EU in securing the ratification and entry into force of the Kyoto Protocol in the face of US opposition is an example in this regard. This international dimension is reflected in the EU's Sixth Environmental Action Programme, which recognises that its strategic objectives can only be achieved if a series of key international environmental agreements are actively supported and properly implemented both at an EU level and worldwide. The entry into force of the Lisbon Treaty further strengthens the EU's global environmental leadership ambitions. The vast body of EU environmental law which now exists has played a vital role in improving habitat and species protection in Europe as well as contributed to improvements in air and water quality and waste management. However, significant challenges remain, both to meet existing EU targets and aspirations and to agree new targets and actions that will further improve the environment and the quality of life in Europe and beyond.

One of the top priorities of EU environmental policy is combating climate change. In 2007, member states agreed that the EU is to use 20% renewable energy in the future and that it has to reduce carbon dioxide emissions in 2020 by at least 20% compared to 1990 levels. This includes measures that in 2020, 10% of the overall fuel quantity used by cars and trucks in EU 27 should be running on renewable energy such as biofuels. This is considered to be one of the most ambitious moves of an important industrialised region to fight climate change.
The EU recently adopted an emissions trading system to incorporate carbon emissions into the economy.

The European Green Capital is an annual award that is given to cities that focuses on the environment, energy efficiency and quality of life in urban areas to create smart city.

See also

 Extreme points of the European Union
 Geographic centre of the European Union
 Geography of Europe
 Regions of Europe

References

External links